The Atomwaffen Division (Atomwaffen meaning "nuclear weapons" in German), also known as the National Socialist Resistance Front, is an international far-right extremist and neo-Nazi terrorist network. Formed in 2013 and based in the Southern United States, it has since expanded across the United States and into the United Kingdom, Canada, Germany, the Baltic states, and other European countries. The group is described as a part of the alt-right by some journalists, but it rejects the label and it is considered extreme even within that movement. It is listed as a hate group by the Southern Poverty Law Center (SPLC), and it is also designated as a terrorist group by multiple governments, including the United Kingdom and Canada.

Members of the Atomwaffen Division have been held responsible for a number of murders, planned terrorist attacks, and other criminal actions.

History
In 2015, the group's creation was announced by founding member Brandon Russell, on the Neo-fascist and Neo-Nazi web forum IronMarch.org, which, prior to its shutdown in 2017, had been linked to several acts of Neo-Nazi terrorism and violent militant groups such as the Nordic Resistance Movement, National Action, CasaPound, and Golden Dawn. In its initial posts, the group described itself as a "very fanatical, ideological band of comrades who do both activism and militant training. Hand to hand, arms training, and various other forms of training. As for activism, we spread awareness in the real world through unconventional means."

The group's membership is mostly young, and it has also recruited new members on university campuses. Its campus recruitment poster campaigns urged students to "Join Your Local Nazis!" and say "The Nazis Are Coming!". It posted recruiting posters at the University of Chicago, the University of Central Florida, the Old Dominion University in Norfolk, Virginia, and Boston University. Atomwaffen Division has recruited several veterans and current members of the U.S. Armed Forces who train the organization's members in the use of firearms and military tactics. A U.S. Navy officer was expelled for allegedly recruiting 12 members for the group and four affiliated US Marines were charged with trafficking and manufacturing firearms for the group. Atomwaffen members have also sought to train with the Azov Battalion and Russian Imperial Movement. In October 2020 Ukraine deported two Atomwaffen members who tried to join Azov for inciting murders and terrorism.

Atomwaffen has ties to various affiliated neo-Nazi groups and the fascist Satanist Order of Nine Angles (O9A), an organization which advocates rape and human sacrifice.

During an investigation, ProPublica obtained 250,000 encrypted chat logs written by members of the group. ProPublica, in early 2018, estimated that Atomwaffen had 80 members, while the Anti-Defamation League estimated that it had 24 to 36 active members. According to International Centre for Counter-Terrorism the group has a large number of "initiates" in addition to 60 to 80 full members.

On March 14, 2020, Mason claimed that the Atomwaffen Division had disbanded. However, the group was believed to be on the cusp of being designated a Foreign Terrorist Organization by the State Department, and the Anti-Defamation League stated that "the move is designed to give members breathing room rather than actually end their militant activities". An intelligence brief distributed by federal law enforcement warned that Atomwaffen and its branches discussed taking advantage of the COVID-19 pandemic. On March 25, 2020, a Missouri man affiliated with Atomwaffen allegedly planned to destroy a hospital treating coronavirus victims with a car bomb and died in a shootout with the FBI.

According to counter-terrorism experts the group remains active and continues to establish affiliates in Europe. On May 31, 2020, it was announced that a new Atomwaffen cell had been uncovered in Russia. Local security services had also just previously uncovered a cell in Switzerland, confirming the suspicions of the German officials that Switzerland served as the linchpin of Atomwaffen's German operation, allowing them to evade law enforcement. European security officials have asked their U.S. counterparts for assistance in combating these cells and urged designating them as terrorist organizations.

In August 2020, months after the claimed disbanding, the group resurfaced yet again, this time as "National Socialist Order".

On April 22, 2021, the British government announced its banning of Atomwaffen/National Socialist Order as terrorist organizations. Similar actions were undertaken by Canada and Australia, which outlawed local Atomwaffen branches in sweeping bans against far-right organizations. Former NSO members released a blog post on their website on September 12, 2022 claiming to start a new organization, the “National Socialist Resistance Front.”

Ideology
In its propaganda videos, Atomwaffen burns copies of the United States Constitution and flag and it also advocates attacks against the federal government of the United States, attacks against minorities, attacks against gays, and attacks against Jews. Atomwaffen Division has engaged in several mass murder plots, plans to cripple public water systems and plans to destroy parts of the continental U.S. power transmission grid. Atomwaffen has also been accused of planning to blow up nuclear power stations. The organization's aim is to violently overthrow the federal government of the United States via terrorism and guerrilla warfare tactics. Since 2017, the organization has been linked to eight killings and several violent hate crimes in the US, including assaults, rapes and multiple cases of kidnapping and torture.

The organization explicitly advocates neo-Nazism, drawing a significant amount of influences from James Mason and his publication Siege, a mid-1980s newsletter of the National Socialist Liberation Front that paid tribute to Adolf Hitler, Joseph Tommasi, Charles Manson, and Savitri Devi. It was  published into a book with the same title that is required reading for all Atomwaffen Division members. Mason, a neo-Nazi and a Holocaust denier who advocates murder and violence in order to create lawlessness and anarchy and destabilize the system, is the main advisor to the group.

Atomwaffen also draws influences from Nazi esotericism and the occult, and its recommended list of reading materials for aspiring initiates includes the works of Savitri Devi and the works of Anton Long, a founding member of the Order of Nine Angles, a British neo-Nazi and a Satanist leader. Some members of the group also sympathize with the Salafi and jihadist forms of Islam. Atomwaffen Division's founder, Brandon Russell, is alleged to have described Omar Mateen, who perpetrated the Orlando nightclub shooting and pledged allegiance to the Islamic State, as "a hero". The group also idolizes Osama bin Laden in its propaganda, and considers "the culture of martyrdom and insurgency" within al Qaeda and ISIL as something which should be emulated. A member of the Atomwaffen Division, Steven Billingsley, was photographed at a vigil in San Antonio, Texas, for the victims of the Orlando shooting, with a skull mask and a sign which read "God Hates Fags", a motto connected to the Westboro Baptist Church.

Members in the United States who faced criminal charges

Non-U.S. branches

United Kingdom (Sonnenkrieg Division)
The Sonnenkrieg Division (Sonnenkrieg being German for "sun war") is a neo-Nazi group that is the United Kingdom-based branch of the Atomwaffen Division, and it maintains its links to the Atomwaffen Division  by e-mail and chat room discussion as well as by its use of similar names and its distribution of similar propaganda. It surfaced in December 2018, when it was revealed that members of the group had suggested on the group's Discord server that Prince Harry was a "race traitor" who should be shot for marrying Meghan Markle, who is of mixed race; that police officers should be raped and killed; and that white women who date non-whites should be hanged. At its formation in 2018 the group was thought to have had 10 to 15 members in the UK and Europe, and some suspected members are thought to have been involved in a previous neo-Nazi group, the System Resistance Network (one of the aliases of National Action), which was linked to various acts of racial violence and arson in the UK. The BBC revealed that the leaders of the group were Andrew Dymock, 21, and Oskar Dunn-Koczorowski, 18.

Police arrested three suspected members of the Sonnenkrieg Division in early December 2018 as part of an "ongoing investigation into extreme right-wing activity". MI5, the British domestic intelligence agency, took the lead in the government's monitoring of far-right terrorism.

On June 18, 2019, Sonnenkrieg members Dunn-Koczorowski and Michal Szewczuk, 19, were jailed for terrorism offences. According to the prosecutor the men promoted "engaging in a "total attack" on the system", Dunn-Koczorowski having proclaimed "terror is the best political weapon for nothing drives people harder than a fear of sudden death" and were intent on action. Furthermore, the group was influenced by James Mason who "may well represent the most violent, revolutionary and potentially terroristic expression of right-wing extremism current today". Dunn-Koczorowski was sentenced to 18 months in prison for encouraging terrorism, and Szewczuk was sentenced to four years in prison for encouraging terrorism and possessing documents that are useful to a terrorist, such as bomb-making instructions.

British anti-fascists say Sonnenkrieg Division has been influenced by the Order of Nine Angles and it is more extreme and potentially more violent than National Action. Hope not Hate's annual "State of Hate" report stated that: "some members have also carried out some of these satanic fantasies and allegations of rape and imprisonment against their own members are circulating." Sonnenkrieg Division members had shared videos of one female supporter being tortured and scored with a knife by one of the group's male members. The private messages which belonged to Sonnenkrieg Division and were acquired by the police included footage of the members of the group abusing women, such as images of the rape of a woman, who had a swastika and runes cut into her flesh.

On February 20, 2019, Jacek Tchorzewski, 18, was stopped by the counter-terrorism unit at Luton Airport. He was arrested on suspicion of terror offences, and the police uncovered "an enormous amount" of manuals on how to make weapons and explosives and Nazi propaganda. In court, it was heard Tchorzewski had said it was "his dream" to commit a terrorist attack and he intended to smuggle firearms and explosives from Germany for this purpose. Also presented was a notebook from his prison cell where he had written, "Let's fill our hearts with terror and London's streets with blood." Commander Richard Smith, the head of the counter terrorism unit, said that Tchorzewski was connected to the Sonnenkrieg Division. Judge Anuja Dhir said Tchorzewski was a "deeply entrenched neo-Nazi with an interest in Satanism and occult practices" and an "offender of particular concern". On September 20, 2019, Tchorzewski was sentenced to four years imprisonment for terrorism offences at the Old Bailey.

On December 4, 2019, Andrew Dymock was arrested and charged with 15 terror offences, including encouraging terrorism and raising funds for a terrorist group. He was first arrested in June 2018 at Gatwick Airport on his way to the United States. Dymock was questioned over alleged sexual offences against a teenage girl, in connection to the earlier assaults on women. He was convicted on all counts on June 12, 2021, and sentenced to seven years' imprisonment on July 21, 2021.

In February 2020, Sonnenkrieg Division became the second far-right group to be banned as a terrorist organization after National Action.

On September 2, 2020, Harry Vaughan pleaded guilty to 14 terrorism offences and possession of child pornography. Vaughan was connected to both National Action and Sonnenkrieg Division. A police search of his house uncovered child pornography, documents showing how to build bombs and detonators, and "satanic, neo-nazi" ONA books advising rape and murder. In addition to this, he was described at the Old Bailey as a firearms enthusiast living with his two young sisters at the time of the arrest.

On March 2, 2021, the Australian home affairs minister, Peter Dutton, accepted an Australian Security Intelligence Organisation (ASIO) recommendation to label Sonnenkrieg Division a "terrorist organisation", citing their reach into Australia. The Sonnenkrieg Division was officially proscribed in Australia on March 22, 2021.

Germany (AWD Deutschland)
On June 1, 2018, in a video in German and English titled  ("AWD Germany: The knives are already being sharpened"), the group announced the establishment of a cell or branch in Germany, followed by the promise of a "long fight". The group's flyers were spotted in Berlin, targeting students. In June 2019, Atomwaffen propaganda was discovered in a Turkish neighborhood in Cologne on the site of a nail bomb attack, threatening further similar attacks.

An unnamed American activist had emigrated to Germany for safety reasons due to threats from Atomwaffen Division. In November 2018 they received a call from the Federal Criminal Police Office to urgently come to authorities. Atomwaffen members had traveled to Germany and the police believed they were in imminent danger of being murdered by the group based on a tip from the FBI.

In October 2019 people claiming to be members of the organization sent death threats to German politicians Cem Özdemir and Claudia Roth. "At the moment, we are planning how and when we will execute you; At the next public rally? Or will we get you in front of your home?" read part of the message sent to the office of the Member of Bundestag, who has Circassian roots. The death threats were condemned by Angela Merkel, and Interior Ministry spokesman Steve Alter commented the security services have "already had this group in their sights for some time".

German T-Online managed to uncover the identity of one of the members of the group, who is referred to as "A" to comply with German privacy laws. "A" had previously instructed people on a now-defunct website how to handle chemicals and how to make the explosive HMTD. He also has a conviction for illegal possession of armor. According to the article "A" is also experienced in martial arts and his social media shows him practicing with guns. The group has a house for meetings somewhere in Eisenach in Thuringia.

On February 5, 2020, a 22-year-old member was arrested in a Bavarian town near the Czech border and several firearms were confiscated from him. He is being investigated on suspicion of preparing a terrorist attack. According to the German police the man had announced his intention of "martyring" himself in an attack against their "enemies" to other members of the group. In addition to this he allegedly instructed others how to procure and smuggle illegal firearms.

It emerged that the Halle synagogue shooting suspect Stephen Balliet was in possession of material by Atomwaffen Division, but his relationship to the group is unclear.

In September 2021, a 20-year-old Marvin E. from the northern Hessian town of Spangenberg was arrested on suspicion of terrorism. The investigators found 600 self-made explosive devices belonging to him. According to the investigators the man had been in contact with the Atomwaffen Division.

In April 2022, hundreds of police officers in eleven federal states took action against suspected members of the "Atomwaffen Division". Among the 50 accused members is a Bundeswehr sergeant. Kalashnikov rifles and gold bars were confiscated in the raids in addition to money and ammunition.

After months of observation, the police took action in Potsdam on June 3, 2022 and arrested a 17-year-old neo-Nazi said to have prepared right-wing terrorist attacks. The teen is said to have obtained instructions for the construction of weapons, ammunition and explosive devices and chemicals for the construction of explosive devices, as well as having built explosive devices and incendiary devices himself and carried out initial explosive tests. According to the investigators, findings in his house and business premises confirmed the suspicion. The Brandenburg Public Prosecutor's Office initiated proceedings on suspicion of preparing a serious act of violence that is dangerous to the state, violating the explosives law and using signs of unconstitutional organizations.

On 4 October 2022, the trial of Maurice P. begun. Maurice is an alleged Atomwaffen Division member and is charged with attempted murder for cutting the throat of a Jamaican man, barely missing the carotid artery.

Atomwaffen Division Europe is a subgroup for Ukrainians and Poles affiliated with the Germans. One of the leaders of the group is Patrick G. who is connected to far-right music label Neuer Deutscher Standard and far-right fashion brand Isegrim Clothing. The Polish police raided the apartment of a member and uncovered Nazi memorabilia and expensive body armor. According to an investigation by German Amadeu Antonio Foundation published on 19 April 2021, the members were acquiring Uzi submachine guns and had attended Azov training camps in Ukraine.

Canada (Northern Order)
The group also has a presence in Canada via an affiliated organization called Northern Order that includes members of the Canadian Armed Forces. Members of the group have also been known to attend the Atomwaffen training camps in the United States. One of the pseudonymous individuals found to be part of the group was a 21-year-old "Dark Foreigner" who creates propaganda for Atomwaffen. The group celebrated the anniversary of the Quebec City mosque shooting by defacing Canadian mosques with neo-Nazi slogans. Gunfire was also reported outside a defaced mosque in Ottawa.

A neo-Nazi affiliated with Atomwaffen serving in the Royal Canadian Navy was discovered to be selling handguns, assault rifles, grenades and RPG-7s from the Balkans to French neo-Nazis in Marseille. The man was discovered to be connected to Serbian Combat 18 and to another local neo-Nazi gang, "MC Srbi". It was confirmed the man had travelled to at least half a dozen cities in the Balkans to meet with his contacts and to procure firearms.

Master Corporal Patrik Mathews, 26, a trained explosives expert, is among the Canadian Armed Forces members accused of being connected to the group and recruiting for it. He is also accused of being affiliated with The Base. In August 2019, two days after being outed by the Winnipeg Free Press as a neo-Nazi recruiter, his truck was found abandoned near the border and it was suspected he was smuggled across the border and had gone underground in the United States. Mathews was arrested in Maryland by the FBI in January 2020. Also arrested were two other members of the group accompanying him: 33-year-old Brian Lemley, Jr, a US Army veteran, and 19-year-old William Bilbrough IV. According to the affidavit the men were building assault rifles and manufacturing the psychedelic drug DMT for occult rituals. They also possessed body armor, a machine gun and in excess of 1600 rounds of ammo. They face a maximum sentence of 10 years for firearm offenses, including transporting a machine gun and transporting a firearm and ammunition with intent to commit a felony.

According to the law enforcement officials the men had planned opening fire from multiple positions on the upcoming 2020 VCDL Lobby Day rally. Bilbrough had also previously talked about fighting with the Azov Battalion. Mathews had instructed others to "Derail some fucking trains, kill some people and poison some water supplies ... If you want the white race to survive, you're going to have to do your fucking part." Lemley told that he could not wait and was excited "to claim my first kill", and said they could ambush and kill police officers and steal their equipment.

Another Canadian neo-nazi attempted to cross the US border a few months after Mathews in November 2019, but was detained by the U.S. Customs and Border Protection's Tactical Terrorism Response Team. They discovered an assault rifle, a shotgun and a pistol and a large amount of Atomwaffen Division propaganda. According to a Federal Bureau of Investigation affidavit the man was going to meet American neo-nazis with whom he had discussed attacking electrical sub-stations to cause power outages.

On September 18, 2020, Toronto Police arrested 34-year-old Guilherme "William" Von Neutegem and charged him with the murder of Mohamed-Aslim Zafis. Zafis was the caretaker of a local mosque who was found dead with his throat cut. The Toronto Police Service said the killing is possibly connected to the stabbing murder of Rampreet Singh a few days prior a short distance from the spot where Zafis' murder took place. Von Neutegem is a member of the O9A and social media accounts established as belonging to him promote the group and included recordings of Von Neutegem performing satanic chants. In his home there was also an altar with the symbol of the O9A adorning a monolith. According to Evan Balgord of the Canadian Anti-Hate Network, they are aware of more O9A members in Canada and their affiliated organization Northern Order.

Canadian Armed Forces launched an internal investigation in October 2020 after a special forces soldier with the CJIRU identified himself as a member of the Northern Order and Order of Nine Angles. According to the SPLC, the man is among "some pretty well-known, high-up people in these organizations" and an acquaintance of Mathews and Mason.

In May 2022, RCMP laid terrorism charge against Seth Bertrand of Ontario over alleged links to Atomwaffen. He was also charged with vandalizing a transgender centre. In June 2022 the RCMP raided houses in St-Ferdinand and Plessisville in rural Quebec allegedly connected Atomwaffen Division. La Presse subsequently reported the raids were related to an Atomwaffen training camp in an old school building in Victoriaville.

The group was designated as a terrorist organization on February 3, 2021.

Baltic states (Feuerkrieg Division)
In October 2018, a group which is modeled after Atomwaffen and calls itself the Feuerkrieg Division (German for "Fire War Division") was established in the Baltic states, most likely in Saaremaa, Estonia where several members of its leadership reside. In mid-2019, the Feuerkrieg gained attention when it issued death threats against Belgian MEP Guy Verhofstadt and YouTube CEO Susan Wojcicki. It has previously praised the actions of Dylann Roof, Robert Bowers, Timothy McVeigh and Brenton Harrison Tarrant, and encouraged violence against government authorities, Jews, LGBTQ people, leftists and feminists. Propaganda videos produced by the group show its members building and detonating homemade explosive devices in Estonia. Feuerkrieg has also shared a video among its members that instructs how to make TATP bombs, used by ISIS in the Manchester Arena bombing. On June 13, 2019, Feuerkrieg Division announced their presence in Ireland and encouraged people in the United Kingdom, the United States, Canada and Germany to join the intercontinental network. Later that year the Gardaí announced they had deported a member of the Atomwaffen network from Ireland for his role in a murder plot.

According to Eesti Rahvusringhääling, an investigation revealed that newly elected Estonian MP Ruuben Kaalep (EKRE) is connected to British neo-Nazi terrorists. Among these a founding member of the former National Action whose followers went on to form the British branch of the Atomwaffen Division, which subsequently opened a branch in Kaalep's native Estonia in the form of the Feuerkrieg Division. ADL and Hope not Hate also confirmed that American and English Nazis and Azov members have visited Tallinn multiple times, organizing events with Kaalep and Feuerkrieg "which began in early 2019, originally organized with Sonnenkrieg" before becoming a full-fledged branch. The Finnish Resistance Movement from neighbouring Finland cooperates with the group as well. Kaalep was also found to have been organizing firearms training with pistols and assault rifles to groups of youths recruited from Blue Awakening, some of whom wore skull masks associated with Atomwaffen and were shown doing Nazi salutes. Kaalep had stated that they are ready for armed combat and the collapse of law and order. The Estonian Internal Security Service had earlier expressed its concern over his events.

On September 2, 2019, the British police arrested a 16-year-old Feuerkrieg member for plotting a mass shooting and arson attacks. The army cadet had professed his admiration for Adolf Hitler and James Mason. Prosecutor Michelle Nelson said he adheres to "occult Nazism" and satanism. He had also allegedly surveyed the synagogues in the Durham area in preparation for the attack and talked with another man about buying a gun from him. He also tried to obtain a dangerous chemical from his neo-Nazi friend. The boy wrote in his journal how he needed to "shed empathy" in preparation for the attack. The group published the addresses of the force's station buildings, custody suites and training centres in retaliation and encouraged its members and sympathizers to kill West Midlands Chief Constable Dave Thompson. It was added that all police are "race traitors" and that police stations should be "considered high value targets to any local NS [National Socialist]". On November 20, 2019, he was found guilty of preparing a terrorist attack and several other terror offenses and is awaiting sentencing in custody. In addition to the terror offenses, he is charged with sexually assaulting a 12-year-old girl. He was eventually convicted of five sexual assaults in addition to the terror offenses.

On October 8, 2019, Feuerkrieg Division took responsibility for the bombing of Western Union offices on the Balčikonis street in Vilnius, Lithuania, posting footage of the bomb being constructed and stated that "Our threats are not empty". Nazi symbols were also spray painted on the building. The next day, a 21-year-old Luke Hunter appeared in court in London charged with terror offences, allegedly having supported the Feuerkrieg Division and encouraged the mass murder of Jews, non-white people and homosexuals. In December 2020 he was sentenced to four years in prison. Subsequently, a 21-year-old Lithuanian named Gediminas Beržinskas was arrested and charged with the bombing and Lithuanian police removed a large quantity of explosives and firearms from his apartment. It was also revealed that his gang had previously been charged with the brutal beating and sexual assault of a teenage girl. The Estonian Internal Security Service also stated that their operation had stopped a similar bombing from taking place in Estonia by another member of Feuerkrieg Division.

On January 16, 2020, a 22-year-old Latvian named Arturs Aispurs was charged with preparing an act of terrorism for building a bomb he was planning to detonate in a crowd of "Muslims and foreigners" during the New Year's Eve celebration in Helsinki. During the search of his apartment the police found a large amount of propaganda in his possession linking him to the neo-Nazi network. In response, Feuerkrieg Division announced they are ceasing their public activities. However, according to an investigation by Der Spiegel into firearm smuggling from the Balkans and Eastern Europe to Germany by Atomwaffen, the purported halt of activities was a ruse targeted at law enforcement, and that the group is still very much active.

According to Eesti Ekspress, Estonian Internal Security Service detained a local teenager they alleged was one of the leaders and recruiters for the group, operating under the nickname "Commander" or "" ("Warlord"). He had instructed others how to build bombs, spoke about planning attacks and encouraged members to take part in the paramilitary training. However, the authorities could not legally arrest him due to his minor status, and being not criminally liable. His alleged status in the group was also disputed by Eesti Ekspress. In a published picture, the boy can be seen wearing a skull mask and holding a pistol, taking part in the firearms training organized by Kaalep, who is also believed to have taken part in the group's chats under the pseudonym "Kert Valter".

In the United Kingdom, the Home Office announced on July 13, 2020, that it has designated the Feuerkrieg Division as a terrorist organization and the designation came into effect on July 17. In addition John Mann, Baron Mann proposed "discussions with Estonian ministerial counterparts, given that the FKD and the Sonnenkrieg Division appear to have strong Estonian links ... to see what we can learn about the reason for the growth in such organisations in the Baltics".

On September 2, 2020, Paul Dunleavy from Warwickshire appeared in Birmingham Crown Court, charged with preparing an act of terrorism. He had allegedly stated he was getting armed and in shape for a mass shooting to "provoke a race war", having acquired a handgun and ammunition for this purpose. He was found guilty on October 2, 2020, and was jailed for five years and six months. On February 1, 2021, a Cornish teenager said to have been the leader of the UK branch of the Feuerkrieg Division pleaded guilty to 12 terrorism offences, making him one of Britain's youngest convicted terrorists. Police had previously raided his home in 2019 for firearms and had found bomb building instructions and O9A literature. Luca Benincasa was sentenced to nine years and three months at Winchester Crown Court in January 2023. He had instructions on bomb making and was a recruiter and "prominent member" of the Feuerkrieg Division and ONA. He pleaded guilty to terrorism offences and possession of child porn.

Russia (AWD Russland) 
On May 31, 2020, it was announced that new Atomwaffen cell had been uncovered in Russia that allegedly receives military training from the Russian Imperial Movement, designated a terrorist organization by the U.S. State Department. United States citizens affiliated with the group are also believed to have taken part.  Leader of the Atomwaffen Division Kaleb Cole allegedly was one of the Americans who was trained by RIM. The ties between Atomwaffen and RIM reach back to 2015 when Brandon Russell met with the leadership of RIM.

BBC Russian Service investigation managed to identify some of the members of the group. Some had previously been active in the banned National Socialist Society whose members committed 27 hate crime murders and decapitated a police informant. The members published a Russian language translation of Brenton Tarrant's accelerationist manifesto. A copy of the book was found in the apartment of Yevgeny Manyurov who was allegedly inspired by it to shoot and kill multiple Federal Security Service agents in the Moscow FSB headquarters. The cell maintains contact with the rest of the Atomwaffen network and affiliated militants in Ukrainian Galicia. In July 2020 Security Service of Ukraine conducted a raid against allegedly affiliated neo-Nazis in Kiev who operated printing presses and sold printed versions of the manifesto and other Nazi literature. Another raid was conducted against a group of neo-Nazis in Odessa planning to burn down a synagogue. Firearms were seized in the raids. According to the Security Service of Ukraine both of these operations were masterminded by men from Russia.

As is the case elsewhere, AWD Russland is connected to the Russian O9A chapter. The group is tied to numerous crimes, including burning down a church, sexual assaults, child prostitution, possession of occult extremist material and incitement to murder due to religious and racial hatred. Multiple members have been arrested and one was sent to involuntary psychiatric treatment. On August 20, 2021, four O9A members were arrested for satanic ritual murders in Karelia and St. Petersburg. Two of them are also accused of large-scale drug trafficking as a large amount of narcotics was found in their home. In October 2021 a cell in Buryatia was arrested for having planned attacks against the government and migrants. The police seized firearms, explosives and Nazi paraphernalia from their hideout in Ulan-Ude.

Italy (Nuovo Ordine Sociale) 
Already previously active in the Italian speaking Switzerland, by 2021 Atomwaffen had a full-fledged chapter in Italy with 38 members, formed in Savona. The group is called Nuovo Ordine Sociale or New Social Order in English. On January 22, 2021, the police arrested a 22 year old leader named Andrea Cavalleri in Savona and searched the houses of 12 other members in Genoa, Turin, Cagliari, Forlì-Cesena, Palermo, Perugia, Bologna and Cuneo in an anti-terrorism operation. Various firearms were seized. Cavalleri is suspected, among other things, of preparing to commit a mass shooting and the police believe they foiled an attack. Ten rifles and three pistols were confiscated from his house. According to investigators he also had published and distributed propaganda inciting a revolution against "Zionist Occupation Government" and extermination of the Jewish people and "race traitors". Cavalleri also allegedly encouraged people to commit mass murder attacks like Anders Breivik and Brenton Tarrant and rape and kill enemies of the group. He is charged with forming a terrorist organization and incitement to criminal actions motivated by racial hatred. The NOS described itself as "A special unit of National Socialist revolutionaries" which "only welcomes warriors ready to die" and has "race war as its main purpose".

On December 27, 2021, five Italian Atomwaffen leaders were arrested and searches were conducted in Pordenone, Brindisi, Milan, Turin, Ferrara, Modena, Verona and Bologna. Nazi propaganda and weapons were confiscated during the raids. The arrested leaders are suspected of distributing information on explosives.

Finland (AWD Finland)
Atomwaffen Division Finland "Siitoin Squadron" (AWDSS) was formed after the ban of the Nordic Resistance Movement (NRM) in 2019, following members of the underground group embracing accelerationism and occultism. The AWDSS was announced on September 15, 2021, the anniversary of the adoption of the swastika flag and the Nuremberg laws in Germany, with footage of members holding assault rifles. However, the group had already been active long before the announcement, and a few of their members had previously been exposed by antifascist activists. The former NRM accelerationists had been active temporarily as Kansallissosialistinuoret ("National Socialist Youth") prior to the formation of the AWDSS. AWDSS also maintains particularly close relations with the Feuerkrieg Division in neighboring Estonia. According to an investigation by Yleisradio, two thirds of the known members who were previously involved with NRM or Soldiers of Odin have a conviction for a violent crime, and multiple have been convicted of murder. In their private chats Finnish Atomwaffen members talk about raping political enemies and publish videos of firearms training.

AWDSS is connected to and shares membership with Finnish O9A nexions. Finnish MP Vilhelm Junnila quoted a newspaper article about Atomwaffen that the nationally active group should be added to the list of proscribed organisations. In September 2021, Save the Children foundation warned that extreme movements like Atomwaffen and O9A were grooming and recruiting children in Finland. Five Finns were previously arrested for sexually abusing multiple children, and according to the police the activities involved "Nazism and satanism" and consumption of methamphetamine. On September 25, 2021, Atomwaffen members assaulted antifascist counterdemonstrators to a Nazi demonstration in Helsinki and were arrested by the police at the scene. Atomwaffen and Finnish lodge of the Black Order also formed a border patrol militia in co-operation, recruiting former military police. According to Seura magazine, some members had previously served in the Azov Battalion.

On December 4, 2021, the Finnish police arrested a five-man cell in Kankaanpää on suspicion of planning a terror attack and confiscated numerous firearms, including assault rifles, and tens of kilos of explosives. According to the Finnish media, the men were part of AWD Finland. Further, they adhered to the ideology of accelerationism and ONA satanism.

France (L'Œuvre)
According to Le Parisien, a French man referred to as Simon planned a double mass murder with an Alsatian man known as Nicholas which was to occur on Hitler's birthday, April 20. As a preparation, Simon had already scouted around his former high school and a nearby mosque, in Seine-Maritime. Simon wrote that "[he] want[ed] to do worse than Columbine", also professing an admiration for mass murderer Anders Breivik. Simon was arrested and taken into custody on September 28, by the police from the General Directorate for Internal Security (DGSI). Brought before an anti-terrorism judge, he was indicted for "criminal terrorist association" and placed in pre-trial detention. At his home, investigators discovered a collection of around 20 knives and at least three firearms including a long rifle equipped with a telescopic sight and a shotgun. Through Atomwaffen Division, Simon came to meet his "brothers in arms", Leila B and Nicholas. Like Simon, Leila B. planned to carry out a deadly attack in her high school. She also planned to plant a bomb in the church closest to her home during the Easter holidays. Detected by the DGSI a few days before the planned day of action, she was indicted on April 8, 2021, for "criminal terrorist association".

Argentina (AWD Argentina)
The existence of Atomwaffen Division affiliate in Argentina was first reported in early 2020. Tomás Gershanik of the Public Prosecutor's Office in Buenos Aires stated that Argentina is no exception, and the local chapter spreads propaganda in universities and organizes firearms drills. The expose by the media was spurred by Grand Rabbi Gabriel Davidovich of Asociación Mutual Israelita Argentina being violently beaten by the Argentinian neo-nazis. According to Cyber Threats Research Centre (CYTREC) at Swansea University, AWD Argentina maintains contacts with Atomwaffen affiliated neo-nazis in neighbouring Brazil. Atomwaffen Argentina is member of Iron Order, a coalition of accelerationist groups.

In popular culture
Atomwaffen has been the subject of four full length documentaries, Documenting Hate: New American Nazis by PBS, "Im Verhör: Die Atomwaffen-Division" (parts one and two) by Spiegel TV and MSNBC's Breaking Hate: Atomwaffen Division.

Karin Slaughter's book The Last Widow features Brandon Russell as a neo-Nazi leader. Incendiary Attraction by Sarah Andre features fictional neo-Nazi group "the Race" that is the sister group of Atomwaffen Division and they perpetrate a terror attack killing Muslims. Ghost Hunter: Occultus by Martin J. Best mentions Atomwaffen and Sonnenkrieg as being tied to a satanic ritual murder.

See also
 Antipodean Resistance, an Australian neo-Nazi group
 Antisemitism in Europe
 Antisemitism in Canada
 Antisemitism in the United States
 Aryan Brotherhood (also known as the Brand or the AB), a neo-Nazi prison gang and an organized crime syndicate which is based in the United States and has an estimated 15,000–20,000 members both inside and outside prisons 
 Aryan Brotherhood of Texas (ABT), an American neo-Nazi and white supremacist prison and street gang 
 Aryan Circle, another American neo-Nazi and white supremacist prison gang which is the rival of the Aryan Brotherhood of Texas
 Aryan Nations, an American neo-Nazi and white supremacist terrorist group which advocated Christian Identity
 Aryan Republican Army (ARA), another American neo-Nazi and white supremacist terrorist group which advocated Christian Identity
 The Base (hate group), a neo-Nazi, white supremacist and accelerationist paramilitary hate group and training network
, a Russian neo-fascist terrorist group
 Combat Terrorist Organization, a Russian neo-Nazi terrorist group
 The Covenant, the Sword, and the Arm of the Lord, another American white supremacist terrorist group which advocated Christian Identity and practiced survivalism
 Far-right politics
 Far-right subcultures
 Fascism
 Fascism in Europe
 Fascism in North America
 Fascism in South America
 Geography of antisemitism
 Hanau shootings
 Ku Klux Klan
 National Action, a banned British neo-Nazi group
 National Socialist Movement (United States), another far-right, Neo-Nazi and White supremacist organization which is based in the United States. It is a part of the Nationalist Front.
 Nazism
 Neo-Confederates
 Neo-fascism
 Neo-Nazism
 NS/WP Crew, a Russian neo-Nazi terrorist group
 Nordic Resistance Movement, a Nordicist, pan-Nordic and neo-Nazi group with ties to terrorist groups
 The Order (also known as the Brüder Schweigen, German for "Brothers Keep Silent"), another American neo-Nazi and white supremacist group
 Patriot Front, another American white nationalist and neo-fascist hate group. Part of the broader alt-right movement, the group split off from the neo-Nazi organization Vanguard America during the aftermath of the Unite the Right rally. 
 Racism in Canada
 Racism in Europe
 Racism in North America
 Racism in the United States
 Radical right (Europe)
 Radical right (United States)
 Right-wing terrorism
 Rise Above Movement
 Terrorgram
 Terrorism in Canada
 Terrorism in Europe
 Terrorism in the United States
 The Savior (paramilitary organization)
 Domestic terrorism in the United States
 Timeline of terrorist attacks in the United States
 List of fascist movements
 List of fascist movements by country
 List of Ku Klux Klan organizations
 List of neo-Nazi organizations
 List of organizations designated by the Southern Poverty Law Center as hate groups
 List of white nationalist organizations

Notes

References

Politics and race
2015 establishments in the United States
Alt-right organizations
Anti-Americanism
Anti-black racism in Europe
Anti-black racism in the United States
Anti-capitalist organizations
Neo-Nazism in Canada
Crimes involving Satanism or the occult
Neo-fascist terrorism
Neo-fascist organisations in Italy
Neo-Nazi organizations in the United States
Neo-Nazism in Germany
Neo-Nazism in Finland
Neo-Nazism in Italy
Neo-Nazism in Russia
Neo-Nazism in Argentina
Right-wing militia organizations in the United States
Syncretic political movements
Satanism and Nazism
Terrorism in Canada
Terrorism in Estonia
Terrorism in Germany
Terrorism in Lithuania
Terrorism in the United Kingdom
Terrorism in the United States
Violence against LGBT people in the United States
Neo-Nazi organisations in the United Kingdom
Youth organizations based in the United States
Organizations designated as terrorist by Canada
Organisations designated as terrorist by Australia
Accelerationism
Anti-communist organizations